Amy Berg may refer to:

 Amy Berg (writer), American TV writer and showrunner
 Amy J. Berg (born 1970), American filmmaker